The Grumman XSBF, also known by the company designation G-14, was an American biplane scout bomber developed by Grumman Aircraft for the United States Navy during the 1930s. Derived from Grumman's successful "Fifi" fighter, the aircraft was developed at a time when the biplane was giving way to the monoplane. In competition against other aircraft it proved to possess inferior performance in its intended role, and did not enter production. The sole prototype went on to serve as a liaison aircraft, as well as being used in experiments by NACA, before being destroyed in a crash in 1939.

Design and development
In late 1934, the U.S. Navy's Bureau of Aeronautics (BuAer) issued a specification for new scout bomber and torpedo bomber designs. Eight companies submitted 10 designs in response, evenly split between monoplanes and biplanes. Grumman, having successfully provided the FF and F2F fighters to the Navy, along with the SF scout, submitted an advanced development of the SF-2 in response to the specification's request for a  aircraft capable of carrying a  bomb. Given the model number G-14 by Grumman, the aircraft received the official designation XSBF-1 by the Navy, and a contract for a single prototype was issued in March 1935.

The XSBF-1 was a two-seat biplane, featuring an enclosed cockpit, a fuselage of all-metal construction, and wings covered largely with fabric. Power was provided by a Pratt & Whitney R-1535 Twin Wasp Junior air-cooled radial engine driving with a variable-pitch propeller. Armament was planned to be two  forward-firing M1919 Browning machine guns, one of which could be replaced by a  M2 Browning; the prototype carried only a single gun. A single .30 in weapon was fitted in the rear cockpit for defense, and one  bomb to be carried in a launching cradle under the fuselage. The arrestor hook was carried in a fully enclosed position, while flotation bags were fitted in the wings in case the aircraft was forced to ditch. The landing gear of the XSBF-1 was similar to that of the F3F fighter.

Operational history
The XSBF-1—piloted by test pilot Bud Gillies—flew for the first time on December 24, 1935. Following initial testing, which found the aircraft to be reasonably faultless, the XSBF-1 was delivered to the U.S. Navy for evaluation in competition with two other biplanes submitted to the 1934 specification, the Great Lakes XB2G and the Curtiss XSBC-3. Unusually for biplanes, all three types possessed retractable landing gear. The evaluation showed that the design from Curtiss was superior to the Grumman and Great Lakes designs, and an order was placed for the Curtiss type, designated SBC-3 Helldiver in service, in August 1936.

With the competition lost, the development of the XSBF-1 came to an end; the sole prototype was assigned to Naval Air Station Anacostia, where it had been tested, for use as a liaison aircraft and hack. In addition, the XSBF was used by the National Advisory Committee for Aeronautics' Langley Research Laboratory as part of the facility's work on aeronautical research. During its time at Anacostia, the aircraft was involved in three accidents, one each in 1937, 1938 and 1939; after the first two accidents, it was repaired. The third accident—on May 25, 1939—resulted in the death of the pilot; the XSBF-1 was no longer considered worth returning to flight status, and the aircraft was officially stricken from the Navy inventory in July 1939.

The SBF-1 designation, unusually, was re-used by the Navy during World War II, assigned to SB2C Helldivers produced under license by Fairchild Aircraft.

Operators

United States Navy

Specifications (XSBF-1)

See also

References

Notes

Citations

Bibliography

External links

Grumman XSBF-1, Aviation Enthusiast Corner.
"List of Design Numbers", The Grumman Pages.

SB01F
1930s United States attack aircraft
Single-engined tractor aircraft
Biplanes
Carrier-based aircraft
Aircraft first flown in 1936